Sirena, formerly R Four, Tahitian Princess, and Ocean Princess is an  formerly owned by Princess Cruises. In March 2016, she was sold to Oceania Cruises and renamed Sirena.

History

[[File:Ocean Princess departing Tallinn 23 June 2013.JPG|thumb|left|'Ocean Princess departing Tallinn, Estonia, 23 June 2013]]

The vessel entered operation in 1999 under the flag of Renaissance Cruises. The ship was not owned by the company; instead she was owned by a group of French investors. When Renaissance declared bankruptcy in 2001, the ship was seized by creditors, along with the other seven vessels in the fleet.

In 2002, Princess Cruises secured a two-year lease for R Four and her sister ship R Three (now ). The vessel entered operation at the end of 2002, and was renamed Tahitian Princess. At the end of the lease, Princess Cruises purchased both vessels.

In November 2009 the Tahitian Princess was renamed Ocean Princess to "reflect a more global theme."

It was announced on 25 November 2014, that the ship was to be sold to Oceania Cruises for $82 million under a finance agreement.  She departed the Princess fleet in March 2016 and underwent a 35-day, $40 million refurbishment in Marseille, France, to become Sirena. On 27 April 2016, The Sirena was christened and entered service for Oceania.

References

External links
  Ocean Princess GDFL images at Ship Spotting World''

 

Ships of Princess Cruises
Ships built in France
Ships built by Chantiers de l'Atlantique
1999 ships